Martin Bachhuber (born October 14, 1955 Benediktbeuern) is a German politician, representative of the Christian Social Union of Bavaria. From 1984 to 2008 he was the mayor of Bad Heilbrunn. Since 2008 he is a member of the Bavarian Landtag.

See also
List of Bavarian Christian Social Union politicians

References

External links
Official site

Christian Social Union in Bavaria politicians
1955 births
Living people